Iquezang Kor.Rungthanakeat (born October 6, 1989) is a Thai Muay Thai and Lethwei fighter. He is best known for defeating  Sitthichai Sitsongpeenong by TKO  to win the Omnoi Stadium Welterweight title (147 lbs) and Fuktien Group Tournament title (147 lbs).

Lethwei 
In 2017, Iquezang began competing in Lethwei circuit in Myanmar. On 5 August 2018, he was invited to face Burmese fighter Soe Lin Oo under traditional rules at Thein Pyu Stadium in Yangon. Soe Lin Oo delivered a flurry of punches that knocked out Iquezang at two minutes and 22 seconds into the third round.

Titles and accomplishments
Muay Thai
 Omoi Stadium
 2011 Omnoi Stadium Welterweight title (147 lbs)
 Fuktien Group
 2011 Fuktien Group Tournament title (147 lbs)
 Thai Fight 
 Member of Thai Fight team since 2012 (26–7 record)

Fight record

|-  style="background:#fbb;"
| 2021-04-25 || Win ||align=left| Fabio Reis || THAI FIGHT DMHTT || Samut Sakhon, Thailand || Decision || 3 || 3:00
|-  style="background:#cfc;"
| 2021-04-03 || Win ||align=left| Vladimir Shuliak || THAI FIGHT Nan || Nan, Thailand || Decision || 3 || 3:00
|-  style="background:#cfc;"
| 2020-11-28 || Win ||align=left| Parmit Grover || THAI FIGHT Pluak Daeng || Rayong, Thailand || KO (Right Hook) || 1 ||
|-  style="background:#cfc;"
| 2020-11-07 || Win ||align=left| Omar Mahir || THAI FIGHT Korat 2020 || Nakhon Ratchasima, Thailand || TKO (3 Knockdowns) || 2 ||
|-  style="background:#cfc;"
| 2020-10-17 || Win  ||align=left| Gladstone Martin-Allen || THAI FIGHT Begins || Nonthaburi, Thailand || KO (Right Hook) || 2 ||
|-  style="background:#fbb;"
| 2020-02-01 || Loss ||align=left| Andi Uustalu || KMC Fight 2020 || Kota Bharu, Malaysia || KO || 1 ||
|-  style="background:#fbb;"
| 2019-10-19 || Loss ||align=left| Roeung Sophorn || Ek Phnom Kun Khmer Arena || Battambang, Cambodia || DQ (Low blow) || 2 ||
|-  style="background:#fbb;"
| 2019-07-28 || Loss ||align=left| Keo Rumchong || Ek Phnom Kun Khmer Arena || Battambang, Cambodia || Decision || 3 || 3:00
|-  style="background:#fbb;"
| 2018-10-29 || Loss ||align=left| Abdelnour Ali-Kada || Yokkao 33 & 34 || Kowloon, Hong Kong || Decision || 3 || 3:00
|-  style="background:#fbb;"
| 2018-01-06 || Loss ||align=left|  Tie Yinghua || Glory of Heroes: Chengdu|| Chengdu, China || TKO (Knee) || 1 ||
|-  style="background:#fbb;"
| 2017-09-07 || Loss ||align=left| Amir Hossein Yousefi || Samui Fight || Koh Samui, Thailand || Decision || 3 || 3:00
|-  style="background:#fbb;"
| 2017-04-08 || Loss ||align=left|  Yohann Drai || THAI FIGHT Paris || Paris, France || TKO (Left Kick to the Body) || 3 ||
|-  style="background:#fbb;"
| 2017-03-04 || Loss ||align=left| Xie Lei || Wu Lin Feng 2017: Kung Fu VS Muay Thai || Zhengzhou, China || Decision || 3 || 3:00
|-  style="background:#cfc;"
| 2016-12-24 || Win ||align=left| Ye Ta Gon || THAI FIGHT The Fighter King || Bangkok, Thailand || KO (Right Hook) || 1 ||
|-  style="background:#fbb;"
| 2016-09-11 || Loss ||align=left|  Salah Khalifa || THAI FIGHT London || London, United Kingdom || Decision || 3 || 3:00
|-  style="background:#cfc;"
| 2016-08-20 || Win ||align=left| Georges Remy Salomon || THAI FIGHT KMITL || Bangkok, Thailand || Decision (Unanimous) || 3 || 3:00
|-  style="background:#cfc;"
| 2016-07-23 || Win ||align=left| Nurgazy Kamilov || THAI FIGHT Proud to Be Thai 2016 || Thailand || KO (Right Head Kick) || 1 ||
|-  style="background:#fbb;"
| 2016-06-05 || Loss ||align=left| Magomedov || EM Legend 9 || Chengdu, China || TKO || 1 ||
|-  style="background:#cfc;"
| 2016-03-12 || Win ||align=left|  Arthur Dutourne || THAI FIGHT || Bangkok, Thailand || Decision (Unanimous) || 3 || 3:00
|-  style="background:#fbb;"
| 2015-12-31 || Loss ||align=left|  Keo Rumchong || THAI FIGHT Count Down || Bangkok, Thailand || Decision (Unanimous) || 3 || 3:00
|-  style="background:#cfc;"
| 2015-11-21 || Win ||align=left|  Sliman Zegnoun || Thai Fight 2015: 2nd Round || Thailand || Decision (Unanimous) || 3 || 3:00
|-  style="background:#cfc;"
| 2015-10-24 || Win ||align=left|  Keo Rumchong|| Thai Fight 2015: First Round || Vietnam || Decision (Unanimous) || 5 || 3:00
|-  style="background:#cfc;"
| 2015-09-17 || Win ||align=left| Vladimir Shuliak || THAI Proud to Be Thai 2015: Moscow || Moscow, Russia || Decision (Unanimous) || 3 || 3:00
|-  style="background:#cfc;"
| 2015-08-22 || Win ||align=left|  Yohann Drai || THAI FIGHT Proud to Be Thai 2015: 100 Years Narathiwat || Narathiwat, Thailand || Decision (Unanimous) || 3 || 3:00
|-  style="background:#cfc;"
| 2015-07-18 || Win ||align=left| Kazbek Zubairaev || THAI FIGHT Proud to Be Thai 2015: China || Zhengzhou, China || KO (Right Flying Knee) || 2 ||
|-  style="background:#cfc;"
| 2015-05-02 || Win ||align=left| Marc Dass Rey || THAI FIGHT Proud to Be Thai 2015: Samui || Thailand || KO (Right Cross) || 2 ||
|-  style="background:#cfc;"
| 2015-04-04 || Win ||align=left| Pich Seha || THAI FIGHT Proud to Be Thai 2015: CRMA || Nakhon Nayok, Thailand || Decision (Unanimous) || 3 || 3:00
|-  style="background:#cfc;"
| 2014-12-21 || Win ||align=left| Saping Yu (Tha Pyay Nyo) || Thai Fight 2014 Final Round || Bangkok, Thailand || Decision (Unanimous) || 3 || 3:00
|-  style="background:#cfc;"
| 2014-11-22 || Win ||align=left| Daniel Manzoni || Thai Fight 2014: 2nd Round || Khon Kaen, Thailand || KO || 2 ||
|-  style="background:#fbb;"
| 2014-09-20 || Loss ||align=left|  Sean Kearny || THAI FIGHT World Battle 2014: Vietnam || Ho Chi Minh City, Vietnam || Decision (Unanimous) || 3 || 3:00
|-  style="background:#cfc;"
| 2014-08-16 || Win ||align=left|  Alex Oller || THAI FIGHT World Battle 2014: Nakhon Sawan || Nakhon Sawan, Thailand || Decision (Unanimous) || 3 || 3:00
|-  style="background:#fbb;"
| 2014-06-28 || Loss ||align=left|  Christophe Pruvost || THAI FIGHT World Battle 2014: Macau || Macau, China || Ex.R Decision (Unanimous) || 4 || 3:00
|-  style="background:#cfc;"
| 2014-04-06 || Win ||align=left| Batyr Ruskorgoloev || THAI FIGHT World Battle 2014: Chakrinaruebet || Sattahip, Thailand || Ex.R Decision (Unanimous) || 4 || 3:00
|-  style="background:#cfc;"
| 2014-02-22 || Win ||align=left|  Jose Neto || THAI FIGHT World Battle 2014: Klai Kang Won || Hua Hin, Thailand || Decision (Unanimous) || 3 || 3:00
|-  style="background:#cfc;"
| 2013-12-22 || Win ||align=left| Vung Noy || Thai Fight 2013: Final Round || Bangkok, Thailand || KO (Right Knee to the Body) || 1 ||
|-  style="background:#cfc;"
| 2013-11-30 || Win ||align=left| Htet Aung Oo || Thai Fight 2013: 2nd Round || Bangkok, Thailand || Decision (Unanimous) || 3 || 3:00
|-  style="background:#cfc;"
| 2013-06-29 || Win ||align=left|  Hugo Nunes || THAI FIGHT Extreme 2013: Bangkok || Bangkok, Thailand || Decision (Unanimous) || 3 || 3:00
|-  style="background:#fbb;"
| 2013-04-19 || Loss ||align=left| Fahmongkol Sor Jor Dangrayong || THAI FIGHT Extreme 2013: Pattaya || Pattaya, Thailand || Decision (Unanimous) || 3 || 3:00
|-  style="background:#cfc;"
| 2013-02-23 || Win ||align=left| Behzad Rafigh Doust || THAI FIGHT Extreme 2013: Muay Thai Day || Ayutthaya, Thailand || Decision (Unanimous) || 3 || 3:00
|-  style="background:#cfc;"
| 2012-12-16 || Win ||align=left| Angelo Veniero || Thai Fight 2012: Final Round || Bangkok, Thailand || KO (Right Elbow to the Body) || 1 ||
|-  style="background:#cfc;"
| 2012-11-25 || Win ||align=left| Simone Cecchini || Thai Fight 2012: 2nd Round || Nakhon Ratchasima, Thailand || Decision (Unanimous) || 3 || 3:00
|-  style="background:#fbb;"
| 2012-01-14 || Loss ||align=left|  Superbon Banchamek || Isuzu Cup 22 Tournament Semi Final, Omnoi Stadium || Bangkok, Thailand || Decision || 5 || 3:00
|-  style="background:#cfc;"
| 2011-07-23 || Win ||align=left|  Sitthichai Sitsongpeenong || Fuktien Group Tournament, Omnoi Stadium || Bangkok, Thailand || TKO (Broken Collar Bone) || 5 || 
|-
! style=background:white colspan=9 |
|-  style="background:#cfc;"
| 2011-06-11 || Win ||align=left| Saksurin Cafefarsai || Fuktien Group Tournament, Omnoi Stadium || Bangkok, Thailand || Decision || 5 || 3:00
|-  style="background:#fbb;"
| 2011-05-14 || Loss ||align=left|  Sitthichai Sitsongpeenong || Fuktien Group Tournament, Omnoi Stadium || Bangkok, Thailand || Decision || 5 || 3:00
|-  style="background:#cfc;"
| 2011-04-09 || Win ||align=left| Songniyom Pumpanmuang || Fuktien Group Tournament || Bangkok, Thailand || Decision || 5 || 3:00
|-  style="background:#cfc;"
| 2011-03-05 || Win ||align=left| Longern Tungsongthaksin || Fuktien Group Tournament || Bangkok, Thailand || Decision || 5 || 3:00
|-  style="background:#cfc;"
| 2008-03-31 || Win ||align=left|  Lerdsila Chumpairtour || Daorungchujarern Fights, Rajadamnern Stadium || Bangkok, Thailand || Decision || 5 || 3:00
|-  style="background:#fbb;"
| 2007- || Loss ||align=left| Jaroenchai Kesagym ||  || Bangkok, Thailand || Decision || 5|| 33:00  
|-
! style=background:white colspan=9 |
|-
| colspan=9 | Legend:

Lethwei record

|- style="background:#fbb;"
| 2019-11-09 || Loss || align="left" | Thway Thit Win Hlaing || (64th) Kayin State Day || Hpa-an, Myanmar || KO || 4 ||
|- style="background:#fbb;"
| 2018-08-05 || Loss || align="left" | Soe Lin Oo || Myanmar vs. Thailand Challenge Fights || Yangon, Myanmar || KO || 3 || 2:22
|- style="background:#c5d2ea;"
| 2017-07-16 || Draw || align="left" | Phyan Thway || Myanmar vs. Thailand Challenge Fights || Yangon, Myanmar || Draw || 5 || 3:00 
|- style="background:#c5d2ea;"
| 2017-03-19 || Draw || align="left" | Saw Gaw Mu Do || Lethwei Fight 2 || Yangon, Myanmar || Draw || 5 || 3:00 
|-
| colspan=9 | Legend:

References

Iquezang Kor.Rungthanakeat
Iquezang Kor.Rungthanakeat
Living people
1989 births
Iquezang Kor.Rungthanakeat